Moriarty is a Sherlock Holmes novel written by author Anthony Horowitz and published in 2014. It is the follow-up, but not a sequel, to The House of Silk. Moriarty takes place in 1891 after the events of Sir Arthur Conan Doyle's "The Final Problem". Scotland Yard detectives with whom Holmes worked in previous cases, such as Athelney Jones and Lestrade, also appear in the novel. The novel follows Pinkerton Detective Agency operative Frederick Chase and Det. Insp. Athelney Jones as they try to prevent a new criminal mastermind from taking over the streets of London after Moriarty's demise.

References

External links
Official site

2014 British novels
Novels by Anthony Horowitz
Sherlock Holmes novels
Sherlock Holmes pastiches
Novels set in London
Orion Books books